Bloserville is an unincorporated community in Upper Frankford Township,  Cumberland County, Pennsylvania, United States. Bloser is located on Enola Road (Pennsylvania Route 944).

References

Unincorporated communities in Cumberland County, Pennsylvania
Unincorporated communities in Pennsylvania